Yersinia mollaretii is a Gram-negative species of bacteria. The species is named after Henri Mollaret, the former head of the National Yersinia Center at Institut Pasteur.

References

Further reading

External links
LSPN lpsn.dsmz.de

Type strain of Yersinia mollaretii at BacDive -  the Bacterial Diversity Metadatabase

mollaretii
Bacteria described in 1988